Prachatice is a town in the South Bohemian Region of the Czech Republic. It has about 11,000 inhabitants. The town centre is well preserved and is protected by law as an urban monument reservation.

Administrative parts
Prachatice is made up of town parts of Prachatice I, Prachatice II and Staré Prachatice, and villages of Kahov, Libínské Sedlo, Městská Lhotka, Oseky, Ostrov, Perlovice, Podolí, Stádla and Volovice.

Etymology
The name is derived from the old Slavic personal name Prachata. It meant "the village of Prachata's people".

Geography
It lies in the Bohemian Forest Foothills. The Živný Stream flows through the town.

History

Prachatice was founded with the beginning of trade on the Golden Trail, an important salt trade route beginning in Passau in Bavaria. Probably in the 9th or 10th century, a settlement was founded in the area of today's Staré Prachatice ("Old Prachatice") town part. In the second half of the 12th century, it was acquired by Vyšehrad Chapter.

When the settlement ceased to suit its purpose, a new settlement was established near the old one at the end of the 13th century. In 1312, Prachatice was first referred to as a town. In 1323, King John of Bohemia confirmed to the town of Prachatice the right to use the trade route to Passau and to collect customs duties there. Prachatice was fully completed in the 3rd quarter of the 14th century.

During the Hussite Wars in the 15th century, Prachatice was attacked twice and eventually conquered by the Hussites who killed most of the population of the town. After the end of the conflict, in 1436, Prachatice was granted the status of royal town by King Sigismund, and all its old privileges were confirmed. Only one year later the town was offered as collateral to Jan Smil of Krems, but fell under the control of the Rosenberg family for a short period following Smil's execution in 1439 at Český Krumlov. Oldřich II of Rosenberg sold the town of Prachatice almost immediately after the execution but it again became property of the family in 1501. In the second half of the 15th century, the number of inhabitants increased and new houses had to be built.

In the 16th century, trade on the trail reached its peak and the town prospered. The Rosenbergs controlled Prachatice until 1601 when Peter Vok of Rosenberg, the last member of the family, sold the town to Emperor Rudolf II who would again make it a royal town in 1609. It remained firmly under royal control until the Bohemian Revolt during which it sided with the rebels. However, in 1620 the town was reconquered and connected to the Krumlov manor. After the Battle of White Mountain, Prachatice lost its royal town status and privileges and became the property of the Eggenberg family, though the emperor's troops remained in the town throughout the remainder of the Thirty Years' War. Later on in the war the town was conquered by the Swedish army and another large ransom was demanded. In the second half of the 17th century, trade on the Golden Trail declined and never was revived.

The town and the whole Krumlov manor changed hands again in 1719, following the death of Princess Marie Arnoštka of Eggenberg, this time coming under the control of the affluent Schwarzenberg family. The weak political and economic situation affected the condition of the houses when old ones were not reconstructed and the new were not built.

Until 1918 the town was part of the Austrian monarchy (Austrian side after the compromise of 1867), in the district of the same name, one of the 94 Bezirkshauptmannschaften in Bohemia.

After 1945 the German population was expelled as a result of World War II.

Demographics

Economy
The dominating industries are machine engineering, electrotechnical industry and timber processing. A new industrial zone has been built.

Culture
The town hosts the Golden Salt Path Celebrations every year with a rich cultural program.

Sights

The historic centre is formed by Velké Square and adjoining streets, and is delimited by the remains of the town walls. Due to the stagnation of economic life in the 17th and 18th centuries, Prachatice have many Renaissance buildings, some of then reconstructed in the Empire style. Since 1981, the historic core of the town has been protected as an urban monument reservation.

One of the main landmarks of the town centre is the Old Town Hall, a Renaissance building from 1570–1571. The New Town Hall was built in pseudo-Renaissance style in 1903.

The Church of Saint James the Great near the square is the largest building in the historic centre. It is a late Gothic building first mentioned in 1359. Its final form was achieved by reconstructions between 1505 and 1513.

Dolní Gate ("Lower Gate"; also called Písecká) is a preserved element of stone town fortifications, which comes from the first half of the 15th century. The gate is from around 1527 and creates the entrance to the historic centre.

Notable people

Christian of Prachatice (c.1368–1439), astronomer, mathematician and medic
Jan Hus (c.1372–1415), theologian, philosopher and reformer, studied here
John Neumann (1811–1860), first American male saint
Miroslav Soukup (born 1965), footballer and football manager
Adolf Zika (born 1972), photographer
David Horejš (born 1977), football player and manager
Kateřina Nash (born 1977), cross-country skier and cyclist
Lucie Sekanová (born 1989), athlete

Twin towns – sister cities

Prachatice is twinned with:

 Castrocaro Terme e Terra del Sole, Italy
 Grainet, Germany
 Ignalina, Lithuania
 Impruneta, Italy
 Mauthausen, Austria
 Rahachow, Belarus
 Waldkirchen, Germany
 Zvolen, Slovakia

References

External links

 
Prachatice on DiscoverCzech travel agency  – basic facts, history, sights, one-day trips

Cities and towns in the Czech Republic
Populated places in Prachatice District
Prácheňsko
Bohemian Forest